Thring is a surname of British origin. It may refer to:

Edward Thring (1821–1887), British educator
F. W. Thring (1883–1936), Australian filmmaker
Frank Thring (1926–1994), Australian actor
Godfrey Thring (1823–1903), British hymn writer
Henry Thring, 1st Baron Thring (1818–1907), British lawyer and parliamentary draftsman
J. C. Thring (1824–1909), British football rulemaker
Sir Arthur Thring (1860–1932), British lawyer and parliamentary draftsman
Meredith Thring (1915–2006), British inventor

See also
 Our Thing (disambiguation)
 Thang (disambiguation)
 Thing (disambiguation)
 Things (disambiguation)
 Thwing (disambiguation)

English-language surnames